Sunil Jaglan is an Indian activist working on education and rights of girl child in Haryana. He is the founder of Selfie With Daughter campaign.

Early life and work 
Sunil Jaglan was initially a teacher and he left his job to become the sarpanch of a village in Haryana called Bibipur. He became advocate for girls' rights when in 2012, two years after he was already the Sarpanch, nurses refused to accept sweets for the birth of his daughter. He also noticed how pregnant women were being aborted in his village after a potential sex determination. Apart from the Selfie With Daughter, Jaglan also initiated Mahil Gram Sabha in 2012 and took the issue of female foeticide in Maha Khap Panchayat. Jaglan introduced the idea of having women participate in these Maha Khap Panchayats and organized these panchayats with zoom because of Covid 19.

He also organized race for girls, awarding a kilo of ghee as prize, bringing focus to women's nutrition. Jaglan also advocated with grandmothers of the houses with campaigns like Dadi Agar Chahegi toh Poti Zaroor Ayegi. Some of this other initiatives include Laado Swabhiman where house nameplates carry the name of the daughter and Pad Mitra which is around menstrual hygiene.

Allegation of financial irregularities and dispute on development 
In 2015, Jaglan got into controversy as he was suspended by Jind deputy commissioner (DC). It was alleged that he used government funds for submersible tubewell at his own private house. The suspension was later stayed by Punjab and Haryana High Court. A professor at Kurukshetra University, Mahabir Jaglan claimed that he conducted a survey in Oct 2012 with his students and found that Jaglan’s village was not doing any different from other villages in the state. Sunil Jaglan made comments to defend himself for irregularities but didn’t respond to Mahabir Jaglan’s survey findings.

References 

Indian activists
Living people
Year of birth missing (living people)